Jagdwurst (literally hunting sausage) is a German cooked sausage made with finely ground pork sausage meat and coarse chunks of lean pork or pork belly. Some recipes also include beef. The meat is usually seasoned with salt and flavoured with spices such as green peppercorns, mace, ginger and coriander. North German styles of Jagdwurst often contain mustard seeds, and in the south, pistachio pieces are a common ingredient.

Jagdwurst can be eaten cold, for example in sandwiches, or hot, sometimes cut into soup and other hot dishes.

In eastern Germany, fried, sliced Jagdwurst, often coated in breadcrumbs, is termed . The dish is essentially a lower-budget schnitzel conceived in harder times and popular in the German Democratic Republic, using sausage instead of lean meat due to its lower price and higher availability.

References

German sausages
Cooked sausages